Higher is a 2002 English language album by Canadian singer Roch Voisine.

Track listing
Higher 
Don't Give Up 
Life's a Beach 
By Myself 
That's More Like It 
I Believe 
Since You Left 
Closer Than Skin 
All About Us 
Virtual Cowboys 
Tears In My Coffee 
The Antidote 
Never 
Myriam's Song (Will You Be My Wife)

External links
Roch Voisine Official site album page

2002 albums
Roch Voisine albums